Dmytro Anatoliyovych Shymkiv (born 28 September 1975  in Lviv) is a Ukrainian top manager in the field of innovations. Еxecutive chairman of Darnitsa Group. Vice-chairman of the Presidential Administration of Ukraine (from 9 July 2014 until August 31, 2018), ex-CEO of Microsoft Ukraine.

Biography

Career 
In 1997 he graduated with honors from Lviv Polytechnic National University.    There he got a degree in radio electronics, information technology and telecommunications. During his studies, Dmytro Shymkiv initiated the creation of "PolyNet", which became one of the first university computer networks in Ukraine.

Between 1998 and 2007, Dmytro Shymkiv managed IT companies and an international team of software developers. In 1998 he moved to Copenhagen, where he worked for ALTA Copenhagen. After returning to Ukraine, Shymkiv founded Alfa Team in 2000, which he sold to the Danish corporation ALTA A/S two years later. Alfa Team became ALTA Eastern Europe, where Shymkiv headed the R&D department of ALTA A/S and led a team of developers in Denmark, Ukraine and the USA.

Between 2007 and 2014, Dmytro Shymkiv worked at Microsoft Ukraine. From March 2007 to May 2009, he managed sales in the corporate segment. In two years, the sales level has grown by 60%. In May 2009, Dmytro Shymkiv became CEO of Microsoft in Ukraine. The branch has been recognized as one of the company's most successful branches several times, in particular in 2011 it became the best division in the world.

From July 2014 to August 2018, Shymkiv worked as Vice-chairman of the Presidential Administration of Ukraine. He was responsible for administrative, social and economic reforms, in particular one of the first tasks was the introduction of e-government in the Presidential Administration. Among his achievements are evangelizing the electronic public procurement system ProZorro,  establishing National Reform Council and Project Management Office for reforms, drafting President’s strategy for sustainable development "Ukraine 2020", promotion of the launch of a 3G / 4G mobile connection, creation of initiatives like "Digital Ukraine" and "GoGlobal" (nationwide learning of English), creation of electronic petitions service to the President of Ukraine, etc.

Since September 2018, Shymkiv has been working for the pharmaceutical company Darnitsa Group, where he is the head of the company’s management board. His responsibilities include international relations, strategic planning, development and implementation of new technologies. He believes that pharmacy is a much more attractive and productive industry than IT.

Dmytro is married and has three children. He is fond of swimming, sailing, history and art.

Public activity 
Dmytro Shymkiv has been a member of various public, non-profit and commercial organizations: the AIESEC Council in Ukraine (since 2003), the Foreign Investment Expert at the Advisory Council to the President of Ukraine (2005-2007), the Bohdan Hawrylyshyn Charitable Foundation and the American Chamber of Commerce in Ukraine (since 2010), member of the Young Presidents' Organization (since 2011) and of the supervisory board of Lviv Polytechnic National University (since 2012), member of ASPEN Ukraine (since 2014), supervisory boards of the Ukrainian Startup Fund (since 2019) and Kyivstar (since 2020) etc.

During the Euromaidan, Shymkiv was one of the first representatives of the Ukrainian IT business that sharply criticized the government's actions. He temporarily resigned as CEO of Microsoft Ukraine and went to the Maidan to defend the rights and freedoms of compatriots.

Activity evaluation 
According to Oleksiy Bilovil, in 2014 Dmytro Shymkiv became the main reformer of the Administration of the President of Ukraine, in particular he initiated the fastest launch of 3G in Ukraine. By citation Shymkiv was the leader in his team.

According to the publication "Vlast deneg" ("Power of Money") in 2020, "Darnitsa" company was included in the list of 25 leaders in digitalization in Ukraine due to the introduction of new technologies. Dmytro Shymkiv is responsible for this sector.

Ratings
In 2010, the magazine "TOP-100. Rating of the best companies in Ukraine" ranked Dmytro Shymkiv among the best top managers (№30).

In 2011, Dmytro Shymkiv was included in the TOP-15 best managers of Ukraine according to the Korrespondent magazine.

In 2012, according to the publishing house "Economy" and the magazine "TOP-100. Rating of the best companies in Ukraine" Shymkiv together with O. Vadatursky became the best top managers of Ukraine.

In 2013, Dmytro Shymkiv was named one of the ten best top managers in Ukraine (according to "Investgazeta" magazine).

In 2020, Dmytro Shymkiv was named one of the Ukrainians who shares useful knowledge about business, pharmaceuticals, and innovation (№18 in the "TOP 100 Most Inspiring Ukrainians").

External links

References 

1975 births
Living people
Businesspeople from Lviv
Microsoft employees
Lviv Polytechnic alumni